Idols: Finalistit 2005 is the cast album of cover songs performed by finalists of Idols Finland 2.

Track listing
 Haaveesta Totta by the 7 finalists of Idols Finland 2
 Piste by Katri Ylander
 Separated by Roni Tran
 In The Shadows by Agnes Pihlava
 Power Of Love by Ilkka Jääskeläinen
 Tuuleksi by Pauliina Kumpulainen
 When Susannah Cries by Pete Seppälä
 Todella Kaunis by Henna Heikkinen
 Kuurupiiloa by Katri Ylander
 Liquid by Roni Tran Binh Trong
 Tallulah by Agnes Pihlava
 Satuprinsessa by Ilkka Jääskeläinen
 I Will Always Love You by Pauliina Kumpulainen
 Hold The Line by Pete Seppälä
 Hallelujah by Henna Heikkinen

Idols (Finnish TV series)
Pop albums by Finnish artists
2005 compilation albums
Covers albums
Pop compilation albums
Compilation albums by Finnish artists